National Doctors' Day is a day celebrated to recognize the contributions of physicians to individual lives and communities. The date varies from nation to nation depending on the event of commemoration used to mark the day. In some nations the day is marked as a holiday. Although supposed to be celebrated by patients in and benefactors of the healthcare industry, it is usually celebrated by health care organizations. Staff may organize a lunch for doctors to present the physicians with tokens of recognition. Historically, a card or red carnation may be sent to physicians and their spouses, along with a flower being placed on the graves of deceased physicians.

Celebrating nations

Australia
In Australia, there are various dates on which National Doctor’s Day may be recognized, the most participated being the 30th of March.

Kuwait
In Kuwait, National Doctor’s Day is celebrated on the 3rd of March. The idea of this celebration came for the Kuwaiti business woman; Zahra Sulaiman Al-Moussawi. And the date was chosen due to it being the birthday of Dr. Sundus Al-Mazidi, her daughter.

Brazil
In Brazil, National Doctors' Day is celebrated as a holiday on October 18, the day on which the Catholic Church celebrates the birthday of Saint Luke. According to the Church Tradition the apostle and Evangelist Saint Luke was a doctor, as it is written in the New Testament (Colossians 4:14).

Canada
National Physicians' Day is celebrated in Canada on May 1. The date was chosen by the Canadian Medical Association in recognition of Dr. Emily Stowe, the first female physician to practice in Canada. Senate Public Bill S-248 will officially recognise the day, if enacted.

China
 is celebrated as a national holiday in China on August 19 annually. The date was selected by the National Health and Family Planning Commission of the People's Republic of China (PRC) in the 2016 National Health and Wellness Conference of China and was approved by in State Council of the PRC on November 20, 2017. The significance of Chinese Doctor's Day is to recognize the great contributions of Chinese doctors to their community and society, encourage the health workers to positively advocate the noble spirit of ‘respect for life, heal the wounded and save the dying, be willing to contribute, and love without boundaries', and further promote the development of a harmony atmosphere of respect for doctors in the whole society, and accelerate the in-depth implementation of the Healthy China strategy.

Cuba
In Cuba, National Doctors' Day is celebrated as a holiday on December 3 to commemorate the birthday of Carlos Juan Finlay. Carlos J. Finlay (December 3, 1833 – August 6, 1915) was a Cuban physician and scientist recognized as a pioneer in yellow fever research. He was the first to theorize, in 1881, that a mosquito was a carrier, now known as a disease vector, of the organism causing yellow fever: a mosquito that bites a victim of the disease could subsequently bite and thereby infect a healthy person. A year later Finlay identified a mosquito of the genus Aedes as the organism transmitting yellow fever. His theory was followed by the recommendation to control the mosquito population as a way to control the spread of the sickness.

El Salvador
Starting in 1969, National Doctor's Day has been celebrated in El Salvador, as per legislative decree, on July 14th to commemorate the day the College of Physicians of El Salvador was founded (July 14th 1943).

India
All across India National Doctors' Day is celebrated on July 1 in memory of Dr. Bidhan Chandra Roy, physician and the second Chief Minister of West Bengal. He was born on July 1, 1882 and died on the same date in 1962.

Indonesia
Hari Dokter Nasional or National Doctor's Day is celebrated in Indonesia on 24 October each year. The day also marked with the birthday celebration of the Indonesian Doctors Association (IDI).

Iran
In Iran, Avicenna's birthday (Iranian Month: Shahrivar 1st=August 23) is commemorated as the national day for doctors.

Malaysia
In Malaysia, Doctors Day is celebrated on the 10th of October every year. It was first launched by the Federation of Private Medical Practitioners Associations, Malaysia in 2014.

Turkey
In Turkey, it is celebrated as Medicine Day on the 14th of March every year since 1919.

United States
In the United States, National Doctors' Day is a day on which the service of physicians to the nation is recognized annually. The idea came from Eudora Brown Almond, wife of Dr. Charles B. Almond, and the date chosen was the anniversary of the first use of general anesthesia in surgery. On March 30, 1842, in Jefferson, Georgia, Dr. Crawford Long used ether to anesthetize a patient, James Venable, and painlessly excised a tumor from his neck.

Vietnam
Vietnam founded Doctor's Day on February 28, 1955. The day is celebrated on February 27 or sometimes dates closest to this date.

Venezuela

March 10 is Venezuelan Doctor’s day. This day was chosen to honor José María Vargas, who was not only an outstanding physician but also a President of the Republic of Venezuela.

Nepal
Nepal also celebrates Nepali National Doctor Day on Nepali date Falgun 20 (4 March). Since the establishment of Nepal Medical Association, Nepal has organized this day every year. The doctor-patient communication, clinical treatment, and community-based health promotion and care is discussed.

History
The first Doctors’ Day observance was March 28, 1933, in Winder, Georgia. This first observance included the mailing of cards to the physicians and their wives, flowers placed on graves of deceased doctors, including Dr. Long, and a formal dinner in the home of Dr. and Mrs. William T. Randolph. After the Barrow County Alliance adopted Mrs. Almond's resolution to pay tribute to the doctors, the plan was presented to the Georgia State Medical Alliance in 1933 by Mrs. E. R. Harris of Winder, president of the Barrow County Alliance. On May 10, 1934, the resolution was adopted at the annual state meeting in Augusta, Georgia. The resolution was introduced to the Women's Alliance of the Southern Medical Association at its 29th annual meeting held in St. Louis, Missouri, November 19–22, 1935, by the Alliance president, Mrs. J. Bonar White. Since then, Doctors' Day has become an integral part of and synonymous with, the Southern Medical Association Alliance.

The United States Senate and House of Representatives passed S.J. RES. #366 during the 101st United States Congress, which President Bush signed on October 30, 1990 (creating Public Law 101-473), designating Doctors' Day as a national holiday to be celebrated on March 30.

Dr. Marion Mass along with Dr. Kimberly Jackson and Dr. Christina Lang applied to officially have physicians day changed to physicians week. This was accepted in March 2017.

In 2017 Physicians Working Together (PWT, founded by Dr. Kimberly Jackson) sponsored a series of articles in celebration of National Physicians week that were hosted on KevinMD. In 2018 PWT along with Openxmed sponsored a free online conference focusing on physician well being and advocacy. In 2019, PWT and Openxmed sponsored a scholarship program for medical students and residents. The week long event focuses on advocacy and supporting the physician community.

References

Sources
 http://www.doctorsday.org/
 http://www.doctorsday.org/Doctors-Day-History.html
 http://www.presidency.ucsb.edu/ws/index.php?pid=47267
 http://thomas.loc.gov/cgi-bin/query/z?c101:S.J.RES.366.ENR:

External links
 National Doctors' Day in United States
 Doctors Day in India
 

March observances
July observances
August observances
Observances in the United States
December observances
Health awareness days